Jesus: His Life is a British drama TV series about the life of Jesus told by the closest people to him. It is interviewed and consulted by a diverse group of scholars such as Robert Cargill, Father Jonathan Morris, Reverend Gabriel Salguero, and Pastor Susan Sparks. The series premiered on 25 March 2019 on the History Channel, and the first season was broadcast for a total of eight episodes.

Cast and characters

Episodes

International broadcast
The series aired in the Philippines on GMA Network from April 9 to 11, 2020, dubbed in Filipino, as part of the network's Holy Week programming. The series was aired again on the same network on April 1, 2021 as a marathon special for Maundy Thursday.

References

External links
 
 

2019 British television series debuts
2010s British drama television series
Television dramas set in ancient Rome
British religious television series
Television series about Christianity
Religious educational television series
History (European TV channel) original programming
Portrayals of Jesus on television
Cultural depictions of Herod the Great
Cultural depictions of Judas Iscariot
Cultural depictions of Saint Peter
Portrayals of Mary Magdalene in film
Portrayals of the Virgin Mary in film
Portrayals of Saint Joseph in film
Television series set in the 1st century